Nils Engelhart (c.1668–1719) was a Norwegian Lutheran priest.

Nils Engelhart was born in Meldal in Sør-Trøndelag. His father Daniel Engelhart (ca. 1638-1733) was the magistrate and later mining administer.   Løkken Mine was located in the municipality. He studied for the ministry in Copenhagen while serving in the Danish-Norwegian Navy. In 1693, he was assigned a personnel chaplain at Tingvoll in Møre og Romsdal. Nils Engelhart had several priesthood assignments in Nordmøre and Romsdal in subsequently years.

Engelhart was an active participant of the pietist association Syvstjernen, along with his friend Thomas von Westen. The influence from Syvstjernen marked a beginning of the Pietism movement in Norway. Engelhart died in Veøy in 1719.

See also
Church of Norway

References

Date of birth unknown
1719 deaths
People from Meldal
17th-century Norwegian Lutheran clergy
Year of birth uncertain
18th-century Norwegian Lutheran clergy